Lorraine Winstanley (née Farlam, born 28 October 1975) is an English darts player who plays in events of the World Darts Federation (WDF).

Career
Winstanley won the 2011 Romanian International Darts Open beating Jane Shearing 5–1 in the final.

She qualified for the 2011 BDO World Darts Championship, where she lost 0–2 to Irina Armstrong in the quarter-finals. The following year, she went one step further by making it through to the semi-finals, where she was narrowly defeated by Deta Hedman in a tie-break final leg decider.

Winstanley qualified again for the World Championships in 2013, and made it as far as the quarter-finals, where she was beaten 0–2 by Anastasia Dobromyslova. Winstanley captured her first major at the 2017 world masters.

She beat Gallagher, Gulliver and Dobromyslova to reach the 2019 World Championship Final but in the final she lost 0–3 to Suzuki. A few days later Winstanley confirmed her intention to compete in Q School for 2019 to try and earn a tour card to compete in the Professional Darts Corporation Pro Tour. She didn't get a tour card.

In 2022 she competed in the inaugural Women's World Matchplay. She reached the Semi-finals but lost 2–5 to Sherlock.

World Championship results

BDO/WDF

Personal life
Winstanley is not a full-time professional darts player, and works as a beauty therapist. She is married to fellow darts player Dean Winstanley and has two children, Josie and Jess, from a previous relationship. Josie was a contestant on One Hundred and Eighty in 2015, winning £2,400; Lorraine was on her team.

References

External links

1975 births
Living people
English darts players
British Darts Organisation players
Professional Darts Corporation women's players